The A Scow is an American scow-hulled sailing dinghy that was designed by John O. Johnson as a racer and first built in 1901.

The A Scow design was developed into the V38, by Victory by Design, LLC in 2005.

Production
The design was initially built by Johnson Boat Works in White Bear Lake, Minnesota United States, but that company closed in 1998 and production passed to Melges Performance Sailboats, who continue to build it.

Design
The A Scow traces its origins back to a Johnson-designed prototype in 1896. Over time the class has changed and evolved into essentially a one design class today. At  length overall, the design is the largest scow raced today and is one of the largest dinghies produced.

The A Scow is a racing sailboat, with the early versions built from wood and the more recent ones built predominantly of fiberglass. It has a fractional sloop with a masthead spinnaker. The hull is a scow design with a raised counter, vertical transom; dual spade-type rudders controlled by dual tillers and dual retractable centerboards. It displaces  and carries no ballast.

The design is raced with a crew of at least five sailors and normally has a total of six or seven crew members to help balance the boat.

Operational history
The boat is supported by a national class club, the National Class A Scow Association, which regulates the class and organizes races. The A Scow is mostly raced on lakes in the midwestern United States.

A film was made about racing A Scows, The Ultimate Ride, by racer Peter Crawford.

A review in Sailing World in 2006 by Gary Jobson, wrote, "these boats sail best when heeled more than 20 degrees, and in a breeze, it takes a lot of courage to do this. The boat rocks up and you feel as if you're about to be catapulted out of the cockpit. But a subtle tug on the tiller, a slight ease of the main and spinnaker sheets, and zingo, you're sailing at 25 knots. There's no crew weight limit, so depending on the wind strength, 5 to 7 crew can be piled on the rail with sailors rotating on or off in between races."

See also
List of sailing boat types

References

External links

Dinghies
Scows
1900s sailboat type designs
Sailboat type designs by John O. Johnson
Sailboat types built by Johnson Boat Works
Sailboat types built by Melges Performance Sailboats